SRO Motorsports Group (formerly the Stéphane Ratel Organisation) is an international sporting organisation best known for promoting and running a variety of racing events and series, including the Total 24 Hours of Spa, Intercontinental GT Challenge and Fanatec GT World Challenge Europe.

The company was founded in 1995 by Stéphane Ratel and is now considered the global leader in GT racing. SRO also organises the multi-disciplinary FIA Motorsport Games, as well as e-sports events and touring car categories. As of 2020 it keeps offices in London, Paris, Liège and Hong Kong, while Ratel continues to act as CEO.

Current Series

Intercontinental GT Challenge powered by Pirelli 
Intercontinental GT Challenge powered by Pirelli was launched in 2016 to bring together major events, such as the Total 24 Hours of Spa and the Bathurst 12 Hour, in a unified global championship. The series is aimed at manufacturers, though rather than field their own cars they are encouraged to appoint and support local teams in selected events. Four manufacturers took part in the inaugural season, while nine entered the most recent in 2020.

The initial seasons consisted of three events before an expansion to four in 2018 and then five in 2019. The same number was planned for 2020 before the Covid-19 pandemic resulted in the cancellation of the Suzuka 10 Hours. There will be five races in 2023: the Total 24 Hours of Spa, Bathurst 12 Hour, Gulf 12 Hours, Indianapolis 8 Hour, and Kyalami 9 Hours.

Fanatec GT World Challenge Powered by AWS 
Fanatec GT World Challenge was launched in 2019 by uniting SRO's established continental series in Europe, Asia and America. Each remains a standalone category while also allowing manufacturers to score points towards a global championship. Mercedes has won three titles to date, finishing ahead of Ferrari in 2019,Audi in 2020,and Lamborghini in 2021. Australia will join the programme in 2021 after SRO agreed to take control of the Australian GT Championship.

The regional series consist of: 
Fanatec GT World Challenge Europe
Fanatec GT World Challenge Asia
Fanatec GT World Challenge America
 Fanatec GT World Challenge Australia
Fanatec GT World Challenge Europe began life in 2011 as the Blancpain Endurance Series before developing into the Blancpain GT Series, a 10-round championship split equally between a Sprint Cup and Endurance Cup. This format remained in place for the change to GT World Challenge Europe in 2019. The championship's marquee event is the Total 24 Hours of Spa, which has run as part of SRO championships since 2011. GT World Challenge Asia was created in 2017 as Blancpain GT Series Asia. GT World Challenge America was for many years known as Pirelli World Challenge before being acquired by SRO in 2018. GT World Challenge Australia will become the fourth series to join the global championship in 2021.

GT4 Series
Launched in 2006, the GT4 class sits below GT3 in terms of performance and is aimed at amateur drivers and aspiring professionals. The concept is owned by SRO, with each series either directly promoted by the company or organised through franchise agreements. A wide variety of cars are homologated for GT4 competition, many of which are considerably closer to their road-legal counterparts than those found in GT3. The GT4 European Series, FFSA GT Championship and GT4 America Series are some of the leading categories reserved solely for GT4 machinery, while others, such as the British GT Championship and GT World Challenge Asia, run mixed grids of GT3 and GT4 cars.

Other GT series

Fanatec GT2 European Series 
Formerly known as the GT Sports Club, the series with an emphasis on gentleman drivers, GT2 European Series is a championship for Bronze, Titanium and Iron drivers only. The Titanium categorisation is within the Bronze category, for drivers between the age of 50 and 59. The Iron categorisation is within the Bronze category, for drivers over the age of 60. Originally the GT Sports Club are contested with GT3-spec, RACB G3, GTE-spec and Trophy cars but during the COVID-19 induced hiatus it was re-organised for the new GT2 regulations and changed the name to GT2 European Series. It supports the GT World Challenge Europe in various circuits along its calendar.

British GT Championship 
Originally created by the BRDC in 1993, the British GT Championship has been overseen by SRO Motorsports Group since 2004. Races feature both GT3 and GT4 cars on-track at the same time, while Pro/Am driver line-ups are the bedrock of the series. The 2021 season is set to consist of seven domestic events and an overseas rounds at Spa-Francorchamps, as well as a revised class structure.

Touring Car Series
 TC America Series
FFSA TC France

Other events
 FIA GT World Cup
 FIA Motorsport Games
 SRO E-Sport GT Series (with Kunos Simulazioni and Ak Informatica)
 Curbstone Track Events

Former series
 BPR Global GT Series
 FIA GT Championship
 FIA GT1 World Championship
 FIA GT3 European Championship
 FIA GT Series
 Formula Renault 2.0 UK Championship
 Renault Clio Cup UK Series
 Blancpain Revival Series (GT90's Revival Series)
 Dutch GT4 Championship (It merged with GT4 European Cup in 2014)
 British Formula Three Championship
 Supercar Rally (features V6, V8 or V10 coupé)
Venturi Gentleman Drivers Trophy
 Lamborghini Supertrophy

References

External links
 SRO Motorsports Group

Auto racing organizations
Organizations established in 1995